Bykle or Bykle Kyrkjebygd (locally: Kyrkjebygdi) is the administrative centre of Bykle municipality in Agder county, Norway. The village is located along the river Otra and the Norwegian National Road 9 in the southern part of the municipality.

The village is the site of the historic Old Bykle Church as well as the much newer Bykle Church. The village also has a school, library, and hotel as well a number of shops and businesses.

References

Villages in Agder
Bykle